The Black Hundred, also known as the black-hundredists (chernosotentsy), was a reactionary, monarchist and ultra-nationalist movement in Russia in the early 20th century. It was a staunch supporter of the House of Romanov and opposed any retreat from the autocracy of the reigning monarch.  The name apparently arose from the Medieval concept of "black", or common (non-noble) people, organized into militias. 

The Black Hundreds were also noted for extremism and incitement to pogroms, nationalistic Russocentric doctrines, and different xenophobic beliefs, including anti-Ukrainian sentiment and anti-semitism.

The ideology of the movement is based on a slogan formulated by Count Sergey Uvarov "Orthodoxy, Autocracy, and Nationality".

Pre-formation
"Svjashchjennaja druzhina" (Священнaя дружинa, or The Holy Brigade) and "Russkoye sobraniye" (Русское собрание, or Russian Assembly) in St. Petersburg are considered to be predecessors of the Black Hundreds. Starting in 1900, the two organizations united representatives of conservative intellectuals, government officials, Russian Orthodox clergy and landowners. A number of black-hundredist organizations formed during and after the Russian Revolution of 1905, such as:
 "Soyuz russkogo naroda" (Союз русского народа, or Union of the Russian People) in St. Petersburg,
 "Soyuz russkikh lyudey" (Союз русских людей, or Union of the Russians) in Moscow,
 "Russkaya monarkhicheskaya partiya" (Русская монархическая партия, or Russian Monarchist Party) in Moscow and elsewhere,
 "Obshchestvo aktivnoy bor'by s revolyutsiyey" (Общество активной борьбы с революцией, or Society of Active Struggle Against Revolution) in Moscow,
 "Belyy dvuglavyy oryol" (Белый двуглавый орёл, or White Two-headed Eagle) in Odessa, Ukraine,
and others.

Predecessors
Members of the Black Hundreds organizations came from different social strata—such as landowners, clergymen, the high and petty bourgeoisie, merchants, artisans, workers and the so-called "declassed elements". The Postojanny Sovyet Ob'yedinnyonnykh dvoryanskikh obschshestv Rossiy (United Gentry Council) guided the activities of the black-hundredists; the tsarist regime provided moral and financial support to the movement. The Black Hundreds were founded on a devotion to Tsar, church and motherland, expressed previously by the motto of Tsar Nicholas I: "Orthodoxy, Autocracy, and Nationality" (Pravoslaviye, Samodershaviye i Narodnost'''). The black-hundredists conducted oral propaganda: in churches by holding special services, and during meetings, lectures and demonstrations. Such propaganda provoked antisemitic sentiments and monarchic "exaltation" and incited pogroms and terrorist acts, performed by the Black Hundreds' paramilitary groups, sometimes known as "Yellow Shirts".

Popularity and power
The Black Hundred movement published newspapers, such as Znamja (The Banner) or Russkoje znamja (Russian Banner), Potschajewskij Listok (The Pochayev Page), Semschina, Kolokol (Bell), Grosa (Thunderstorm), Vetschje and others. Many rightist newspapers, such as Moskowskije wedomosti (Moscow News), Graschdanin (Citizen) and Kievljanin (Kievan), published their materials as well. Among the prominent leaders of the Black Hundred movement were Alexander Dubrovin, Vladimir Purishkevich, Nikolai Markov, A. I. Trishatny, Pavel Krushevan, Pavel Bulatsel, Ivan Vostorgov, M. K. Shakhovskoy, Saint John of Kronstadt, Hieromonk Iliodor, Bishop Hermogen, and others.

Incitement to violence

When two Duma delegates,  (Poltava province) and Mikhail Herzenstein (b. 1859, d. 1906 in Terijoki), both from the Constitutional Democratic Party, were assassinated by members of the Black Hundreds, their press organ Russkoe Znamya declared openly that "Real Russians assassinated Herzenstein and Iollos with knowledge of officials", and expressed regret that "only two Jews perished in the crusade against revolutionaries." The black hundred were known to have used violence and torture on anyone they believed was a threat to the Tsar.

Members of the Black Hundreds carried out raids (with unofficial government approval) against various revolutionary groups and pogroms, including inciting pogroms against Jews.

The historian of the Black Hundred movement Sergei Stepanov writes that after the 1905 Russian Revolution, fighting squads of the Union of the Russian People and other extremist right-wing organizations became the weapons of the Black Hundred terror.

 Fight against the Black Hundreds 
Radical socialist parties organized revolutionary terror in retaliation to the Black Hundred activities. Vladimir Lenin, leader of the Bolshevik faction of the RSDLP wrote in 1905: 

The fight against the Black Hundreds is an excellent type of military action, which will train the soldiers of the revolutionary army, give them their baptism of fire, and at the same time be of tremendous benefit to the revolution. Revolutionary army groups must at once find out who organises the Black Hundreds and where and how they are organised, and then, without confining themselves to propaganda (which is useful, but inadequate) they must act with armed force, beat up and kill the members of the Black-Hundred gangs, blow up their headquarters, etc., etc.On behalf of the St. Petersburg Committee of the RSDLP, an armed attack was carried out on the Tver tea house, where the workers of the Nevsky Shipbuilding Plant, who were members of the Union of the Russian People, gathered. First, two bombs were thrown by the Bolshevik militants, and then those who ran out of the teahouse were shot with revolvers. The Bolsheviks killed two and wounded fifteen people.

Revolutionary organizations carried out many other terrorist acts, mainly against the chairmen of local departments of the Union of the Russian People. So, according to the police department, only in March 1908 in one Chernigov province in the city of Bakhmach a bomb was thrown at the house of the chairman of the local union of the RNC, in the city of Nizhyn the house of the chairman of the union was set on fire, and the whole family died, in the village of Domyany the chairman of the department was killed, two chairmen of departments were killed in Nizhyn.

The Socialist-Revolutionaries also killed such prominent Black Hundreds as Nikolai Bogdanovich and Gavril Luzhenovsky.

Black Hundred and the Ukrainian question
The Black Hundreds classified Ukrainians as Russians, and attracted the support of many "Moscowphiles" who considered themselves Russian and rejected Ukrainian nationalism and identity. The Black Hundred movement actively campaigned against what it considered to be Ukrainian separatism, as well as against promoting Ukrainian culture and language in general, and against the works of Ukrainian poet Taras Shevchenko, in particular. In Odessa, the Black Hundreds shut down the local branch of the Ukrainian Prosvita society, an organization that was dedicated to spreading literacy in the Ukrainian language and Ukrainian cultural awareness.

All-Russian congresses
The black-hundredists organized four all-Russian congresses with the purpose of uniting their forces. In October 1906, they elected the so-called glavnaya uprava (a kind of board of directors) of the new all-Russian black-hundredist organization "Ob’yedinyonniy russkiy narod" (Объединённый русский народ, or Russian People United). After 1907, however, this organization disintegrated, and the whole Black Hundreds movement became weaker as the membership rate steadily declined. During the February Revolution of 1917, the remaining black-hundredist organizations were officially abolished.

After emigrating abroad, many black-hundredists were among the main critics of the White movement. They blamed the movement for not only failing to stress monarchism as its key ideological foundation, but also supposedly being run under the influence of classical liberals and Freemasons. Boris Brasol (1885–1963), a former member of the Black Hundreds, was among those who later emigrated to the United States. There he befriended industrialist Henry Ford, who gave Brasol a job on The Dearborn Independent newspaper. Brasol also helped in the production of The International Jew.
Modern version

After the fall of the Soviet Union, the nationalist and monarchist movements were reborn in the Russian society. In 1992, Alexander Shtilmark (former member of Pamyat) decided to found a modern Black Hundred movement.

The movement maintains contacts with other Russian nationalist organizations (like the Russian Imperial Movement and the Union of Orthodox Banner-Bearers) and also participated in the early stages of the Russo-Ukrainian War on the side of pro-Russian separatists.

In popular culture
 In Jack London's 1908 novel The Iron Heel, which predicts the rise of a hypothetical fascist regime in the US, the regime's anti-labor hired thugs use the name of the Black Hundreds.
 In Bernard Malamud's 1966 novel The Fixer, which portrays Yakov Bok as a Jewish man who survived the pogrom and moved to Kiev, Yakov changes his last name to sound more Russian and soon becomes hired by a member of the Black Hundred.
 In Edward Rutherfurd's 1991 novel Russka, a young Bobrov (one of the fictional families portrayed in the novel) is beaten in the street by a gang of young Black Hundreds for being Jewish-looking and being the son of a social democrat.
 In Roots: The Next Generations, a Jewish friend of the series' black protagonists jokes that the Ku Klux Klansmen who burn down his shop are mere pikers next to the "Czar's Black One Hundred".
 In Anatoli Rybakov’s 1988 novel Children of the Arbat, in part II, chapter 13, set in Moscow in the mid 1930s, the Sharoks' old neighborhood Okhotny Row is described as having many storekeepers who had been Black Hundreds. In part III, chapter 5, Khanlar Safaraliyev, an oil worker, is killed by thugs who belong to a gang of Black Hundreds; Stalin makes a speech at his grave side.

References

Further reading
 Norman Cohn. Warrant for Genocide: The Myth of the Jewish World-Conspiracy and the Protocols of the Elders of Zion (1966)
 Laqueur, Walter. Black Hundred: The Rise Of The Russian Extreme Right (1993)
 Donald C. Rawson. Russian Rightists and the Revolution of 1905'' (1995)

External links
 Black Hundreds Live Again, news article on the celebrations of the Black Hundreds' 100th anniversary in Russia

Organizations of the Russian Revolution
Anti-Jewish pogroms in the Russian Empire
Antisemitism in Russia
Far-right political parties in Russia
Eastern Orthodoxy and far-right politics
Eastern Orthodox political parties
Political parties in the Russian Empire
Russian nationalist organizations
Anti-Ukrainian sentiment
Defunct nationalist parties in Russia
Monarchist parties in Russia
Antisemitism in Ukraine
Xenophobia
Anti-communist organizations in Russia
Organizations of the 1905 Russian Revolution
Defunct far-right parties
Defunct conservative parties
Conservative parties in Russia
Political parties established in 1905
1905 establishments in the Russian Empire
Political parties disestablished in 1917
1917 disestablishments in Russia